Patrick Savage may refer to:
Patrick Savage (judge)
Patrick Savage (rugby league)
Patrick Savage (composer)
Patrick Savage (footballer)

See also
Pat Savage (disambiguation)